Tang Huawei (born 16 May 1972) is a Chinese painter known for his oil paintings of landscapes.

Biography
Tang was born in 1972 in Hunan Province. He moved to Beijing in 1990, where he studied at the China Central Academy of Fine Arts under the painter Feng Fasi (冯法祀). He then studied at the graduate school of the Chinese National Academy of Arts (中国艺术研究院). He once cooperated with Feng in the large oil painting, "Ethos-Live Paintings of Mount Huangshan", by Xu Beihong and his students (see in Living an Artistic Life-Feng Fasi, the Oil Painting Master of 20th Century, an album of national collections and donations of the National Art Museum of China, edited by Fan Di'an).

In 2015, Tang organized an exhibition of his oil painting that traveled to Taipei, Germany and Singapore.

References

Further reading
 "传统文化构建当代艺术的生命精神——唐华伟的油画：Constructing the Life Spirit of Contemporary Art with Traditional Culture--Tang Huawei's Oil Painting". Contemporary Oil Painting, May 2015, p. 194.
 "狗和人--读《面孔》系列作品--邓国皇：Dog and Human Beings--Reflections upon Tang Huawei's "Visage" Painting Series by Deng Guohuang.", Contemporary Oil Painting, July 2012, p. 144.

External links
 Tang Huawei official website

Painters from Hunan
Living people
1972 births
Central Academy of Fine Arts alumni